Central Station was the Southern Pacific Railroad's main passenger terminal in Los Angeles, California. It was formerly on Central Avenue at Fifth Street, in eastern Downtown Los Angeles. The primary hub for Southern Pacific's passenger operations in Southern California, it was served by the Sunset Limited, Coast Daylight, Golden State, and other named trains. The station replaced the company's previous Los Angeles terminal, Arcade Depot, and was often referred to by the name of the older facility.

History
The Southern Pacific Railroad (SP) was the most used of the three mainline railroads that serviced Los Angeles in the early 20th century (the others being the Los Angeles and Salt Lake Railroad and Santa Fe Railroad). Southern Pacific began investigating the replacement of the aging Arcade Depot as early as 1913 in anticipation of increased passenger numbers to the state as a result of hosting both the San Francisco Panama–Pacific International Exposition and San Diego Panama–California Exposition in 1915.

Passenger trains began operating at the station's new tracks on December 1, 1914. The station building opened on May 2, 1915. In 1918, just over 50% of all passenger traffic was provided via Southern Pacific and Central Station. The Union Pacific Railroad, which had its main Los Angeles train station (built 1891) damaged in a fire, began operating from the station in 1924.

In addition to long-distance trains, the station was served by the two local electric railways. Pacific Electric Red Cars stopped at the station until 1950, calling at Ceres and Central on the west side of the building. Passengers could get cars to Sierra Vista, Pasadena, Edendale, Long Beach and San Pedro. By 1938, the Los Angeles Railway Yellow streetcar lines D, U, and 3 stopped in front of the building on Central Avenue.

In 1926 voters in Los Angeles voted 51% to 49% to build a union station. All long-distance passenger services were transferred to the new Los Angeles Union Station upon that building's completion in 1939. Pacific Electric cars continued to run here until September 1940 when trips were rerouted to the Subway Terminal Building.

The Central Station was demolished on August 22, 1956.

Design
The station was designed by the firm of Messrs, Parkinson & Bergstrom. Features which governed its design included:

 Pedestrian and track grade separation
 Separation of incoming and outgoing passengers
 Amenities for waiting passengers
 Adequate baggage facilities
 An efficient and convenient train ticket office
 A centralized information bureau
 Additional operational facilities including a power plant, kitchen and dining room, office, private car yards, etc.

References

Railway stations in Los Angeles
Buildings and structures in Downtown Los Angeles
Los Angeles Central
Demolished buildings and structures in Los Angeles
Demolished railway stations in the United States
History of Los Angeles
Landmarks in Los Angeles
Demolished buildings and structures in California
Transit centers in the United States
Railway stations in the United States opened in 1914
1914 establishments in California
1910s architecture in the United States
Railway stations closed in 1939
1939 disestablishments in California
Beaux-Arts architecture in California
Los Angeles Central
Buildings and structures demolished in 1956
Pacific Electric stations